The 1951 Sugar Bowl was a college football bowl game played on January 1, 1951. The 17th playing of the Sugar Bowl, it was one of the 1950–51 bowl games concluding the 1950 college football season.

Teams

Kentucky

Kentucky entered the bowl with a 10–1 record. The Wildcats were 5–1 in SEC play, thus winning the conference title. The Wildcats' lone loss was to Tennessee. This was the Wildcats' first appearance in a Sugar Bowl.

Oklahoma

Oklahoma entered the Sugar Bowl top-ranked with a 10–0 record, having won all 6 of their Big Seven regular season games, thus clinching the conference title. Both major polls (AP writers, UP coaches) awarded the Sooners with their first national championship at the end of the regular season. Oklahoma had a record of 2–0 in prior Sugar Bowl games, having won in 1949 and 1950.

Game summary
Kentucky fielded three defensive tackles for much of the game, which caused Oklahoma quarterback Claude Arnold to hurry his handoffs and passes.  One Wildcat tackle was Bob Gain, winner of the Outland Trophy that season.  The third was Walt Yowarsky, who had played less than five minutes on defense during the regular season.  Yowarsky recovered a fumble on the Oklahoma 22-yard line, leading to Kentucky's first score: on the next play after Yowarsky's fumble recovery, Kentucky quarterback Babe Parilli threw a touchdown pass to Wilbur Jamerson for a 7–0 lead at the end of the first quarter. In the second quarter, the Wildcats drove 81 yards for a touchdown, a run by Wilbur Jamerson, and led 13–0 at halftime.

In the third quarter, Oklahoma had the ball, first and goal on the Kentucky 3-yard line.  The Wildcat defense held on first and second down; on third down Yowarsky tackled the Oklahoma ball carrier for a five-yard loss.  On fourth down, the Sooners were stopped and Kentucky took possession.

In the fourth quarter, Yowarsky recovered a fumbled punt. With seven minutes left in the game, Oklahoma quarterback Billy Vessels threw a 17-yard touchdown pass to Merrill Green. Kentucky, however, retained possession of the football for the rest of the game, with the exception of one play, for a 13–7 victory. Yowarsky was named the game's Most Valuable Player.

Statistics

References 

Sugar Bowl
Sugar Bowl
Kentucky Wildcats football bowl games
Oklahoma Sooners football bowl games
Sugar Bowl
Sugar Bowl